Jillian Tyler (born September 5, 1988) is a former competition swimmer who represented Canada in two consecutive Olympic Games.  At the 2008 Summer Olympics in Beijing, and again at the 2012 Summer Olympics in London, Tyler competed in the 100-metre breaststroke and advanced to the semifinals before being eliminated.

References

1988 births
Living people
Canadian female breaststroke swimmers
Olympic swimmers of Canada
People from Didsbury, Alberta
Swimmers at the 2008 Summer Olympics
Swimmers at the 2012 Summer Olympics
Pan American Games medalists in swimming
Pan American Games silver medalists for Canada
Swimmers at the 2003 Pan American Games
Medalists at the 2007 Pan American Games
20th-century Canadian women
21st-century Canadian women